Koker or Kokers may refer to:

Koker (surname)
Koker, Iran, a village
 Koker (Guyana), local term for a sluice (water channel)
Koker (singer), Nigerian afro-pop singer
Kokers Films, an Indian production company
Project Koker, a Canadian police investigation of the Hells Angels Motorcycle Club in Edmonton and Calgary

See also
Koker trilogy, movies filmed in the Iranian village